The Roman Catholic Archdiocese of Delhi is a Latin Church Metropolitan archdiocese of the Catholic Church in northern India.

Its cathedral archiepiscopal see is Sacred Heart Cathedral, in the national capital city of New Delhi

History 
 13 September 1910: Established as Metropolitan Archdiocese of Simla, on territory split off from the Metropolitan Archdiocese of Agra and Diocese of Lahore.
 13 April 1937: Renamed as Metropolitan Archdiocese of Delhi and Simla.
 4 June 1959: Renamed as Metropolitan Archdiocese of Delhi, having lost territory to establish as suffragan the Diocese of Simla.
Pope John Paul II made two papal visits, in February 1986 and November 1999.

Statistics 
Personnel consisted of 301 priests (130 diocesan, 171 religious), 1,006 lay religious (391 brothers, 615 sisters) and 25 seminarians.

Ordinaries
(all Latin Church)

Metropolitan Archbishops of Simla
 Archbishop Anselm Edward John Kenealy, Capuchin Franciscans (O.F.M. Cap.) (21 December 1910 – 13 January 1936 see below)
Apostolic Administrator Archbishop Anselm Edward John Kenealy, O.F.M. Cap. (see above 13 January 1936 – 13 April 1937), when retired as Titular Archbishop of Ratiaria (13 January 1936 – death 8 December 1943)

Metropolitan Archbishops of Delhi and Simla 
 Silvestro Patrizio Mulligan, O.F.M. Cap. (13 April 1937 – death 16 August 1950), retired Titular Archbishop of Cyrrhus (1950.08.16 – 1950.10.23)
Apostolic Administrator Father John Burke (1950 – 12 April 1951) (later Bishop)
 Joseph Alexander Fernandes (12 April 1951 – 4 June 1959)

Metropolitan Archbishops of Delhi 
 Joseph Alexander Fernandes (4 June 1959 – 16 September 1967)
 Angelo Innocent Fernandes (16 September 1967 – 19 November 1990)
 Alan Basil de Lastic (19 November 1990 – 20 June 2000)
 Vincent Michael Conçessao (7 September 2000 – 30 November 2012)
 Auxiliary Bishop: Franco Mulakkal (17 January 2009 – 13 June 2013)
 Anil José Tomas Couto (30 November 2012 – ...)

Ecclesiastical province 
Delhi's ecclesiastical province comprises the Metropolitan's own archdiocese and the following suffragan dioceses:
 Roman Catholic Diocese of Jammu–Srinagar 
 Roman Catholic Diocese of Jalandhar
 Roman Catholic Diocese of Simla and Chandigarh

Sources and external links 
 GCatholic.org
 Catholic Hierarchy
  Archdiocese website

See also 
 List of Roman Catholic dioceses in India

Roman Catholic dioceses in India
Religious organizations established in 1910
Christianity in Delhi
Roman Catholic dioceses and prelatures established in the 20th century
1910 establishments in India